is the senior executive officer, general manager of marketing and licensing for Nintendo as well as the outside director of The Pokémon Company. He was named president of Nintendo of Europe when Shigeru Ota left in August 2000 until 30 June 2018. Shibata was formerly the Managing Director of Nintendo Australia.

Shibata has appeared at several presentations including the Nintendo Show, the Nintendo DS event in Paris, the Nintendo of Europe Wii event in September 2006, the European Nintendo 3DS press conference in Amsterdam in January 2011, and at Gamescom 2011. He has also promoted several games through interaction with celebrities, such as playing Wii Sports tennis with Tim Henman and Greg Rusedski, and singing "Call Me Maybe" for Carly Rae Jepsen. He has also gained attention for various other actions, including a fashion show for New Style Boutique and cosplaying as Phoenix Wright.

Starting in 2012, Shibata hosts the European editions of Nintendo Direct, and has often appeared alongside Nintendo's former global president, Satoru Iwata. Before the first European Nintendo Direct aired, Shibata had very seldom appeared in public due to his shyness; however, he gained greater exposure following his appearances in those presentations, as well as in letters sent to Nintendo 3DS owners in Nintendo Letter Box.

References

Japanese chief executives
Nintendo people
Living people
1962 births